The 2012 North Carolina A&T Aggies football team represented North Carolina A&T State University as a member of Mid-Eastern Athletic Conference (MEAC) during the 2012 NCAA Division I FCS football season. Led by second-year head coach Rod Broadway, the Aggies compiled an overall record of 7–4 with a mark of 5–3 in conference play, placing in a three-way tie for third in the MEAC. North Carolina A&T played home games at Aggie Stadium in Greensboro, North Carolina.

Schedule

Coaching staff

References

North Carolina AandT
North Carolina A&T Aggies football seasons